The National Union of Independents for Democratic Renewal (UNIRD) was a political party in Niger.

History
The party was established following the January 1996 coup in order to support the candidacy of coup leader Ibrahim Baré Maïnassara in the July 1996 presidential elections. In the November 1996 parliamentary elections, which were boycotted by most opposition parties, it won 59 of the 83 seats.

The following year the party was dissolved and replaced by the Rally for Democracy and Progress.

References

Defunct political parties in Niger
Political parties established in 1996
1996 establishments in Niger
Political parties disestablished in 1997
1997 disestablishments in Niger